My Murdered Remains is the 21st album by American alternative rock band They Might Be Giants, released on December 10, 2018 for digital download and pre-order. The physical album was released in the spring of 2019. The digital download and pre-order was released simultaneously with The Escape Team. The standard disc consists entirely of songs from the band’s 2018 Dial-a-Song project; a bonus disc is included which also features songs from the similar 2015 Dial-a-Song project which had yet to be released on an album, as well as a new song entitled "This is Only Going to Go One Way."

Track listing

Personnel
They Might Be Giants
 John Flansburgh – vocals, guitars, programming, etc.
 John Linnell – vocals, keyboards, woodwinds, etc.
Backing Band
 Marty Beller – drums
 Dan Miller – guitars
 Danny Weinkauf – bass guitar
Additional musicians
 Robin Goldwasser - backing vocals on track 3
 Corn Mo - vocals on track 19 (track 3 of the bonus disc)
Production
 Daniel Avila – engineering
 Pat Dillett – production, mixing
 James York – engineering

References

2018 albums
Idlewild Recordings albums
They Might Be Giants albums
Albums produced by Pat Dillett